Overlook Colony is an unincorporated community in Claymont, New Castle County, Delaware, United States.

Geography
Overlook Colony is located west of the Philadelphia Pike between Harvey Road and Darley Road. It is east of Interstate 95 (separating it from  Ashbourne Hills and Radnor Green) and CSX Transportation Philadelphia Subdivision rail. The south branch of Naamans Creek and  run through the area.

History
The original layout for Overlook Colony was originally designed by city planner and landscape architect John Nolan while the buildings were designed by architect H. Errol Coffin It was developed in the early 1910s largely as workforce housing of the General Chemical Company.

Some the homes have been expanded and restored to historic specifications.
 The community center was restored in 2000.

It has been designated a "Blueprint Community", an initiative by Federal Home Loan Bank of Pittsburgh and the University of Delaware too reinvigorate distressed neighborhoods.

See also
Union Park Gardens
Worthland, Delaware
Hickman Row

References

External links

Unincorporated communities in New Castle County, Delaware
Unincorporated communities in Delaware